Everything for Sale is a 1969 Polish drama film written and directed by Andrzej Wajda. The film was selected as the Polish entry for the Best Foreign Language Film at the 42nd Academy Awards, but was not accepted as a nominee.

Cast
 Beata Tyszkiewicz as Beata
 Elżbieta Czyżewska as Elzbieta
 Andrzej Łapicki as Andrzej
 Daniel Olbrychski as Daniel
 Witold Holtz as Witek
 Malgorzata Potocka as The Little
 Bogumił Kobiela as Bobek
 Elżbieta Kępińska as Actress in Theatre
 Irena Laskowska as Forester's Wife
 Tadeusz Kalinowski as Forester

See also
 List of submissions to the 42nd Academy Awards for Best Foreign Language Film
 List of Polish submissions for the Academy Award for Best Foreign Language Film

References

External links
 

1969 films
1969 drama films
1960s Polish-language films
Films directed by Andrzej Wajda
Polish drama films